Evans Timothy Fosu Fosu-Mensah (born 2 January 1998) is a Dutch professional footballer who plays as a defensive midfielder, centre-back or full-back for Bundesliga club Bayer Leverkusen and the Netherlands national team. He formerly played for Dutch club Ajax's youth team and English club Manchester United's first team.

Club career

Manchester United
Born in Amsterdam to Ghanaian parents, Fosu-Mensah began his career with Ajax, before moving to England in 2014. Fosu-Mensah has played for Manchester United's youth teams in a variety of positions, including centre-back, right-back and central midfield. He made his professional debut at left-back on 28 February 2016, in a 3–2 Premier League win at home to Arsenal, coming on as a 55th-minute substitute for Marcos Rojo.

On 19 October 2016, he signed a new long-term contract with Manchester United until 2020, with the option to extend for a further year.

Crystal Palace (on loan)
On 10 August 2017, Fosu-Mensah joined Crystal Palace on a season-long loan, reuniting with his former boss at Ajax, Frank de Boer. He made his debut for Palace two days later on 12 August 2017 against newly promoted Huddersfield Town, losing 3–0. Despite the defeat, Fosu-Mensah was praised for his last-minute tackle on Steve Mounié, denying him a hat-trick.

Fulham (on loan)
On 9 August 2018, Fosu-Mensah joined Fulham on a season-long loan. He made his debut for Fulham on 18 August 2018, in a 3–1 away defeat to Tottenham Hotspur in the Premier League, playing the full 90 minutes. On 13 April 2019, he suffered a knee ligament injury which saw him returning to Manchester United.

Return to United
On 27 June 2020, Fosu-Mensah made his first United senior matchday squad since 21 May 2017 as he sat on the bench for 120 minutes in an FA Cup tie against Norwich City.

On 16 July 2020, Fosu-Mensah started for United against former side Crystal Palace, his first start since 21 May 2017, when he faced Palace at Selhurst Park.

Bayer Leverkusen
On 13 January 2021, Fosu-Mensah completed a transfer from Manchester United to Bayer Leverkusen. On 28 February 2021, he suffered another knee ligament injury that ended his 2020–21 season.

On 15 January 2022, Fosu-Mensah made his first appearance in 321 days, coming off the bench in the second half of a 2–1 win over Borussia Mönchengladbach.

International career
Having played at under-15, under-16, under-17 and under-19 levels for the Netherlands but also eligible for Ghana, Fosu-Mensah was rewarded for his performances for Manchester United with his first call-up to the senior team for friendlies against the Republic of Ireland, Poland and Austria. He was also eligible to play for Ghana as he qualified through his parents. He received another call-up to the Dutch senior squad on 28 August 2017, replacing the injured Kenny Tete for the 2018 FIFA World Cup qualifiers against France and Bulgaria. Fosu-Mensah made his first senior appearance for the Netherlands on 31 August 2017, when he was named in the starting line-up against France in a 4–0 defeat.

Personal life
Fosu-Mensah is the brother of fellow footballers Alfons and Paul.

Career statistics

Club

International

Honours
Manchester United
FA Cup: 2015–16
UEFA Europa League: 2016–17

References

External links

Profile at ManUtd.com
Netherlands profile at OnsOranje

1998 births
Living people
Footballers from Amsterdam
Dutch footballers
Netherlands youth international footballers
Netherlands international footballers
Association football midfielders
AFC Ajax players
Manchester United F.C. players
Crystal Palace F.C. players
Fulham F.C. players
Bayer 04 Leverkusen players
Premier League players
UEFA Europa League winning players
Dutch expatriate footballers
Expatriate footballers in England
Expatriate footballers in Germany
Dutch expatriate sportspeople in England
Dutch expatriate sportspeople in Germany
Dutch sportspeople of Ghanaian descent